Elachista heinemanni is a moth of the family Elachistidae. It is found in the Alps.

Adults are on wing from the first half of June to the first half of August.

The larvae feed on Sesleria albicans. They mine the leaves of their host plant. They are olive grey.

References

heinemanni
Moths described in 1866
Moths of Europe